The scientific name Euphorbia obtusifolia has been used for at least three species of Euphorbia:

Euphorbia obtusifolia  is a synonym of Euphorbia terracina , native from Macaronesia through Hungary and the Mediterranean to the Arabian Peninsula
Euphorbia obtusifolia  is an illegitimate name that has been applied to:
Euphorbia lamarckii  – of which it is a synonym; native to the western Canary Islands (Tenerife, La Gomera, La Palma and El Hierro); also known by the synonym Euphorbia broussonetii
Euphorbia regis-jubae  – with which it has been confused; native to the eastern Canary Islands (Gran Canaria, Lanzarote and Fuerteventura), west Morocco and north-western Western Sahara

References

Set index articles on plants
obtusifolia